The Zee Cine Award for Most Promising Director is an Indian film award which began in 2005.

In 2002, Zee Cine tried to acknowledge debut directors by creating a Zee Cine Special Award for Debut Director. In 2005, the category for most promising director was made official. A group of juries chose the best candidate out of five nominated directors. The inaugural Zee Cine Award for Most Promising Director was given to Farah Khan for Main Hoon Na.

Winners

See also 
 Zee Cine Awards
 Bollywood
 Cinema of India

References

Zee Cine Awards
Awards established in 2005
2005 establishments in India